{{Infobox person
| name               = Daniel Stedman
| image              = 
| caption            = 
| birth_date         = 
| birth_place        = Maine, United States
| death_date         = 
| death_place        = 
| other_names        = 
| known_for          = Owner and Co-founder of The L Magazine and Brooklyn Magazine and Northside Festival| occupation         = PublisherFilmmakerEntrepreneur
| nationality        = 
}}

Daniel Stedman is an American entrepreneur and multi-award-winning film director, producer and writer and publisher. Stedman is the founder of Pressto. Stedman was the owner and president of Northside Media Group until its acquisition, as well as the founder and CEO of The L Magazine Brooklyn Magazine and BAMbill. Stedman is an organizer for Taste Talks, SummerScreen in McCarren Park, and the Northside Festival.

Early life
Stedman is the third child of Barbara and Michael Stedman. His father Michael Stedman was born in the Old Harbor Housing Project on O'Callaghan Way in South Boston and former U.S. Army Reserve soldier with the 94th Infantry.

Background
Stedman received a degree in physics from Bates College in Lewiston, Maine. He lived at Shakespeare and Company in Paris and at the Chelsea Hotel following his divorce. He currently lives in New York City, and has had poems published in the Paris journal Kilometer Zero.

Career

Filmmaker

His short film Celebration received recognition, and allowed him to be the youngest filmmaker ever invited to the Berlin International Film Festival. His work became recipient of multiple awards, most notably a Teddy Award by an independent jury at the 2002 Berlin International Film Festival. His work has played at numerous international film festivals, including the prestigious Cannes Film Festival.

More recently, both Stedman and his cousin Aron Epstein acted in and co-directed his film The Moth and the Firefly. Inspired by the New York City blackout of 2003, the animated short film had its world premiere at the San Joaquin International Film Festival in May 2009. It won 'Bronze Palm' at the Mexico International Film Festival.

Publisher

He is co-founder and former president of '''The L Magazine, and runs the web site Yourlocal.com. When first launched in 2003, The L Magazine had a heated rivalry with the New York Press. This was settled when Jeff Koyen, editor-in-chief of New York Press met with Scott Stedman, editor-in-chief of The L Magazine and brother of Daniel Stedman, for a one-on-one charity boxing match on October 29, 2003.

He is the owner and president of Brooklyn Magazine, founded in 2010.

Writer

He co-wrote the children's book "The Moth and the Firefly"

Media

Stedman speaks and has been interviewed at SXSW, CES, Orange Institute, The New York Times, New York Magazine, Refinery29, Huffington Post, TechCrunch, Inc. Magazine, The New York Observer, Vogue Japan, Newsweek & The Village Voice. He presented the launch of the Dell XPS 13 at the Consumer Electronics Show in Las Vegas.

Modeling
Stedman posed in Vogue Japan and in United Arrows Fall 2017 campaign.

Northside Media Group 

Stedman and his brother Scott launched Northside in 2003.It published the L Magazine, Brooklyn Magazine, and organized events like the Northside Festival, a six day extravaganza of music, art, film, and technology.  It was sold to Zealot Networks in 2015.  

Stedman and Northside Festival dropped the band Good English from their 2016 lineup after the drummer defended a Stanford University student accused of sexual assault.

In 2020, Northside Media was sold to Michael Bassik.

Pressto 
In 2021, Stedman founded Pressto. Pressto is an educational platform that develops strong writing skills in students by making writing playful and fun. Before launching the company, he spent months on research and found that there would be a strong desire for a product that helped students with critical writing and media literacy.

In pop culture 
Stedman was portrayed by Zach Galifiniakis in the Season One finale of Bored to Death.

Filmography

Awards and nominations
2002, won 'Le Roger' at the Avignon Film Festival
2002, won 'Stonewall Award' at the Barcelona International Gay & Lesbian Film Festival
2002, won 'Teddy Award' at Berlin International Film Festival
2002, won 'Audience Award' at Torino International Gay & Lesbian Film Festival
2002, nominated 'Best Short Film' at Torino International Gay & Lesbian Film Festival

References

External links
Official Site

American film producers
American film directors
American male poets
American magazine founders
Bates College alumni
Year of birth missing (living people)
Living people